The  men's team military rifle, also referred to as the International, was one of 15 events on the Shooting at the 1908 Summer Olympics programme. A bulls-eye counted for 5 points, and thus the highest possible score for each shooter was 450 points, with the team maximum being 2700.

Each shooter was required to use his nation's official military rifle.

Results

References

Sources
 
 

Men's rifle military team